Gajec is a village in Croatia, located about 20km north east of Zagreb. It is connected by the D29 highway.

References

Populated places in the City of Zagreb